Congleton is an unincorporated community in Lee County, Kentucky, United States. Its post office closed in 1950.

References

Unincorporated communities in Lee County, Kentucky
Unincorporated communities in Kentucky